Htoo is a Burmese name that may refer to the following notable people:
Nay Htoo Naing (born 1979), Burmese actor and film director
Ba Htoo (1916–1945), Burmese army officer
Han Htoo, Burmese lawyer 
Khin Khin Htoo (born 1965), Burmese writer
Kyaw Htoo (born 1994), Burmese football midfielder 
Naw Sar Mu Htoo (born 1953), Burmese politician

Burmese names